The Voice: la plus belle voix (season 1) was the first season of the French reality singing competition, created by media tycoon John de Mol.  It was aired from February 2012 to May 2012 on TF1.

One of the important premises of the show is the quality of the singing talent. Four coaches, themselves popular performing artists, train the talents in their group and occasionally perform with them. Talents are selected in blind auditions, where the coaches cannot see, but only hear the auditioner.

The coaches were Florent Pagny, Jenifer, Louis Bertignac and Garou. The First Season ended on May 12, 2012, Stephan Rizon was declared the winner.

Overview

 – Winning Coach/Contestant. Winner and finalists are in bold, eliminated contestants in small font.
 – Runner-Up Coach/Contestant. Final contestant first listed.
 – 2nd Runner-Up Coach/Contestant. Final contestant first listed.

Results

Step 1 : « Auditions à l'aveugle » (Blind Auditions)
The Blind Auditions were taped on 10, 11, 16, 17 and 18 January 2012.

Episode 1: February 25, 2012

Episode 2: March 3, 2012

Episode 3: March 10, 2012

Episode 4: March 17, 2012

Step 2 : « Battles Musicales » (Musical Battles)
The Blind Auditions were taped on 14 and 16 February 2012 at the studio Lendit, in La Plaine Saint-Denis, near Paris. Coaches begin narrowing down the playing field by training the contestants with the help of "trusted advisors". Each episode featured four battles consisting of pairings from within each team, and each battle concluding with the respective coach eliminating one of the two contestants; the four winners for each coach advanced to the live shows.

The trusted advisors for these episodes are: Jacques Veneruso working with Garou, Sandra Derlon working with Jenifer, John Mamann working with Florent Pagny and Maurice Suissa working with Louis Bertignac.

Episode 5: March 24, 2012

Episode 6: March 31, 2012

Step 3 : « Primes » (Live Shows)

Public voting across phone commenced at this point, with one candidate eliminated from each team in the first two live shows. Voting lines were opened during the broadcast of each live show on Saturday.

The first half of each team performed in the first Live Show, the second half in the second Live Show.

Episode 7: April 7, 2012

Competition Performances

Non-competition performances

Episode 8: April 14, 2012

Competition Performances

Non-competition performances

Episode 9: April 21, 2012

Competition Performances

Non-competition performances

Episode 10: April 28, 2012

Competition Performances

Non-competition performances

Episode 11: May 5, 2012

Competition Performances (Semi-finals)

Non-competition performances

Episode 12: Towards the final: May 11, 2012

The 12th episode broadcast live at 22h30 on May 11, 2012 included the 4 finalists, namely Louis Delort of Team Garou, Al.Hy of Team Jennifer, Stéphan Rizon of Team Stéphan Rizon and Aude Henneville of Team Louis Bertignac perform their audition songs again in preparation for the final, after the 8 tour finalists performed collectively. Will Smith was the special guest for the episode.

Performances during the special episode

Episodes 13 - Final -  May 12, 2012
13th episode was the final broadcast on 12 May 2012 live starting 20h50. In addition to the finalist, special guests performed collaborations including  Johnny Hallyday, Véronique Sanson, Lenny Kravitz and Yannick Noah.

Team of each coach was represented by the remaining finalist from the team. It was announced that the winner would get a recording contract with Universal Music France as well as a cash prize of 150,000 €.

The 4 finalists were:

Performances by finalists 
Stéphan Rizon

Aude Henneville

Louis Delort

Al.Hy

Ratings

See also 
 The Voice: la plus belle voix
 The Voice (TV series)

References

External links
 The Voice: la plus belle voix Official website

2012 French television seasons
The Voice: la plus belle voix